A list of films produced in Russia in 2011 (see 2011 in film).

2011

See also
 2011 in Russia

References

External links
 Russian films of 2011 at the Internet Movie Database

2011
Films
Russia